Jurić is a Croatian surname derived from the masculine name Jure, Jura or Juraj with the patronymic-forming suffix -ić/-ič.

It is the fifth most common surname in Croatia.

It may refer to:
 Ante Jurić, (1922–2012), Croatian priest
 Ante Jurić, (1934–2013), Croatian footballer
 Ante Juric (b. 1973), Australian footballer
 Duje Jurić (b. 1956), Croatian artist
 Frank Juric (b. 1973), Australian footballer
 Goran Jurić (b. 1963), Croatian footballer
 Ivan Jurić (b. 1975), Croatian football coach and former player
 Marija Jurić Zagorka (1873–1957), Croatian journalist, novelist and dramatist
 Mario Jurić (b. 1979), Croatian astronomer
 Mario Jurić (b. 1976), Bosnian footballer
 Predrag Jurić (b. 1965), Yugoslav and Bosnian footballer
 Stipe Jurić (b. 1998), Bosnian footballer
 Tomi Juric (b. 1991), Australian footballer
 Tomislav Jurić (b. 1990), Croatian footballer
 Zvonimir Jurić (b. 1971), Croatian film director

See also
Đurić, a surname
Jurčević, a surname
Jurčić, a surname
Juričić, a surname

References

Croatian surnames
Patronymic surnames
Surnames from given names